The Women's time trial of the 2007 Dutch National Time Trial Championships cycling event took place on 15 August 2007 in and around Zaltbommel, Netherlands over a 22.28 km long flat parcours.

Ellen van Dijk (Vrienden van het Platteland) became for the first time in her career Dutch National Time Trial Champion by the elite. Van Dijk was already national time trial champion when she was a junior in 2004 and 2005. Regina Bruins finished second and Mirjam Melchers third.

Race details

Starting list

Startlist from wielersupport.nl

Final results

Results from cyclingarchives.com and cqranking.com.

References

External links

Dutch National Time Trial Championships
2007 in women's road cycling